Karol Stefani Bermúdez Da Costa Martínez (born 18 April 2001) is a Uruguayan professional footballer who plays as a midfielder for Brazilian Série A1 side Atlético Mineiro and the Uruguay women's national team.

International career
Bermúdez represented Uruguay at the 2018 South American U-17 Women's Championship, the 2018 FIFA U-17 Women's World Cup and the 2018 South American U-20 Women's Championship. She made her senior debut on 8 October 2019 in a 1–3 friendly loss to Chile.

References 

2001 births
Living people
People from Durazno
Uruguayan women's footballers
Women's association football midfielders
Liverpool F.C. (Montevideo) players
Club Nacional de Football players
Clube Atlético Mineiro (women) players
Campeonato Brasileiro de Futebol Feminino Série A1 players
Uruguay women's international footballers
Uruguayan expatriate women's footballers
Uruguayan expatriate sportspeople in Brazil
Expatriate women's footballers in Brazil